Betty Creek is a stream in the U.S. states of Georgia and North Carolina. It is a tributary to the Little Tennessee River.

Betty Creek was named after "Little Betty", a Cherokee woman.

References

Rivers of Georgia (U.S. state)
Rivers of Rabun County, Georgia
Rivers of North Carolina
Rivers of Macon County, North Carolina